Mourning Has Broken is a 2013 Canadian dark comedy film written and directed by the Butler Brothers. The film stars Robert Nolan as a man who wakes up to find that his ailing wife, laying beside him in bed, has died in the middle of night. After finally getting out of bed the husband proceeds to go about the day as if nothing has happened, systematically going through his 'to-do' list that was left on the fridge for him by his wife. As the husband attempts to complete the tasks, his interactions with various people and things along the way become increasingly aggressive, often in a darkly funny manner. As he completes his list it becomes very clear that he is not coping with the loss of his wife very well at all, becoming emotionally unhinged, resulting in him taking his own life at the end.

The film premiered at the 2013 Calgary International Film Festival. The US premiere was at the 2013 Anchorage International Film Festival where it won the Audience Choice Award. The film was released theatrically in Canada on January 24, 2014 by Indiecan Entertainment.

Cast 

 Robert Nolan as Husband
 Shawn Devlin as Neighbor
 Jennifer DeLucia as Clerk
 JoAnn Nordstrom as Bartender
 Graham Kent as Mechanic
 Brett M. Butler as Homeboy
 Jason G. Butler as Father
 Damien Gulde as Hipster
 Kevin Scott as Salesman
 Serena Miller as Bimbo
 Mike Donis as Douche

References

External links 
 
 

2013 independent films
2013 films
Canadian black comedy films
Canadian independent films
English-language Canadian films
Films set in Canada
Films shot in Ontario
2010s Canadian films